Dryptodon may refer to:
 Dryptodon (plant), a genus of mosses in the family Grimmiaceae
 Dryptodon, a genus of fossil animals in the family Stylinodontidae; synonym of Ectoganus